Kandawgyi Lake (literally "great royal lake", formerly Royal Lake), is one of two major lakes in Yangon, Myanmar. Located east of the Shwedagon Pagoda, the lake is artificial; water from Inya Lake is channelled through a series of pipes to Kandawgyi Lake. It was created to provide a clean water supply to the city during the British colonial administration. It is approximately 5 miles (8 km) in circumference, and has a depth of 20 to 45 inches (50 to 115 cm).

The  lake is surrounded by the  Kandawgyi Nature Park, and the 69.25-acre (28-hectare) Yangon Zoological Gardens, which consists of a zoo, an aquarium and an amusement park.

The lake itself is bounded by Natmauk Street to its north and east, Bahan Street to its west, and Kanyeiktha Street to its south. The lake used to be the site of the Rangoon Rowing Club turned Kandawgyi Palace Hotel, which was gutted by a fire in 2017.  Along the eastern shorelines of the lake is the famous Karaweik, a concrete replica of a Burmese royal barge built in 1972. It houses a buffet restaurant today.

On 15 April 2010, three bombs exploded in a road near to the lake in the afternoon during the Burmese New Year festival; 10 people were killed and 178 injured.

References 

Lakes of Myanmar
Geography of Yangon
Parks in Myanmar
Tourist attractions in Yangon